Alsask is a special service area in the Rural Municipality of Milton No. 292, in the province of Saskatchewan, Canada. Highway 44 runs to the east of Alsask, and Highway 7 lies a few kilometres to the north. The community had a population of 113 in the 2021 Canadian census (a 1.8% increase from 111 in the 2016 Canadian census).

The community's name combines the names of Alberta and Saskatchewan, although it is a misconception that it straddles the border between the two provinces. Alsask's most notable landmark is one of three remaining radar domes that for many years operated as Canadian Forces Detachment Alsask as part of the Pinetree Line, operated by the Canadian Armed Forces. Southeast of the town is Alsask Lake.

History 

Alsask incorporated as a village November 22, 1910; two years later on November 1, 1912 it was decided the village was large enough to incorporate into a town. By 1916 the population of Alsask had reached 300.

The Great Depression in Canada hit Alsask hard, and the village struggled with maintaining its population. The town was reverted to a village on January 1, 1947.

Things began to change; in 1959 with the establishment of Royal Canadian Air Force Station Alsask, a  base was established next to the town site, and by the early 1970s the population had reached over 800, though the village never reverted to town status. The base was disbanded in 1987.

Since the closure of the RCAF Station Alsask, the village population continued to decline; by 2009, the Village of Alsask was dissolved as a political entity, and a motion was accepted to join the Rural Municipality of Milton as a special service area on July 30, 2009.

Heritage sites
CFD Alsask became a designated heritage site in 2002. The site is the former Royal Canadian Air Force Alsask Station, a Cold War era, military base and Pinetree Line radar dome, open to public Monday to Friday. Few of the original buildings remain. Most notably, the "Gopher Dip" indoor swimming pool as it was known during the lifespan as a military site, is still in use. During the summer months the swimming pool is well used, attracting many children and families from surrounding communities. The site also includes a bowling alley built to entertain families of the RCAF and Alsask and area residents.

The Old Alsask School operated from its opening in 1913 until 1976 when the property was taken over by the Village of Alsask. In 2002 the building was restored as a community centre and is now listed as a Municipal Heritage Property.

Demographics 

Health

Alsask was part of the Heartland Regional Health Authority which was amalgamated with the Saskatchewan Health Authority

Climate 
Alsask experiences a semi-arid climate (Köppen climate classification: BSk). Winters are long, cold and dry, while summers are short and warm.

Notable people 
Notable persons who were born, grew up or lived in Alsask:
 Bob Adams – Track and field athlete
 Karin Plato – Canadian jazz vocalist and composer
 Lorne Shantz – Politician, and former MLA in the British Columbia Legislature

See also 

 List of communities in Saskatchewan
 List of hamlets in Saskatchewan

References 

Milton No. 292, Saskatchewan
Designated places in Saskatchewan
Former villages in Saskatchewan
Special service areas in Saskatchewan
Populated places disestablished in 2009
1911 establishments in Saskatchewan
Division No. 13, Saskatchewan